Xe is the seventh studio album by American experimental ensemble Zs. It is their second album to feature guitarist/composer Patrick Higgins and percussionist Greg Fox, noted for his work with Liturgy and Guardian Alien.  The album artwork was designed by Tauba Auerbach and was acquired for the permanent collection of the SF MOMA in 2016.

Track listing

Personnel
Credit Information taken from AllMusic and the Northern Spy Records website

Zs
 Sam Hillmer – tenor saxophone, pedals
 Patrick Higgins – electronics, guitar
 Greg Fox – drums, percussion

Technical personnel
 Patrick Higgins – producer, mixing
 Henry Hirsch – engineer
 Heba Kadry - mastering
 Tauba Auerbach – artwork

References

2015 albums
Zs (band) albums